

Ingwald (or Ingweald; died 745) was a medieval Bishop of London in England.

Ingwald was consecrated between 705 and 716. He died in 745.

Citations

References

External links

Bishops of London
745 deaths
Year of birth unknown
8th-century English bishops